Raíces (Spanish "roots") may refer to:

Geography
 Raíces, Zinacantepec, State of Mexico, second highest-altitude village in Mexico

Film
 Roots (film) (Spanish: Raíces), a 1955 Mexican drama film

Music
 Raíces (band), Argentine rock band of the 1980s
 Raíces (Colomer), a composition for symphony wind orchestra by Valencian composer Juan J. Colomer
 Raíces (Julio Iglesias album), 1989
 Raíces (Los Tigres del Norte album), 2008

Organizations
 The Refugee and Immigrant Center for Education and Legal Services (RAICES)